Clitoraid is a non-profit project started by the Raelian movement to combat female genital mutilation.

The project was started in 2005 or 2006. The Raelian movement sees sexual gratification as a positive thing and Clitoraid has sponsored clitoral reconstruction for African women and sought to build a hospital in Burkina Faso where they can also receive post-operative instruction in masturbation. Clitoraid has an Adopt a Clitoris sponsorship program, which it has promoted at the AVN Adult Entertainment Expo in Las Vegas.

In 2010, on the encouragement of sexologist Betty Dodson, the San Francisco-based sex shop chain Good Vibrations pledged financial support to Clitoraid including asking customers to make donations; the company rescinded the offer after protests that the effort was misplaced, especially from Wanjiru Kamau-Rutenberg, a professor of politics at the University of San Francisco. In 2013, Clitoraid designated the week of 6–12 May as "International Clitoris Awareness Week".

The 2014 opening of the Kamkaso Hospital or The Pleasure Hospital at Bobo-Dioulasso was delayed by the Burkina Faso Ministry of Health.  Clitoraid blamed the Catholic Church.

In 2015, in response to a dispute over the circumcision of a four-year-old boy in the US, Clitoraid issued a press release supporting the mother who did not want the circumcision.  They also called on the United Nations to ban the practice: "Bodily harm is against the fundamental rights of all children, and we can't understand when a so-called civilized country such as the United States would allow its male babies to be so readily mutilated legally!"

References

External links

Activists against female genital mutilation
Raëlian practices
Circumcision debate
Clitoris